The 1983 New Zealand Grand Prix was a race held at the Pukekohe Park Raceway on 8 January 1983. It was the 29th running of the New Zealand Grand Prix and was run over two heats of 30 laps each, with the final results being an aggregate of the two based on points. The event was won by New Zealander David Oxton. The podium was completed by fellow Kiwis Paul Radisich and Dave McMillan.

Classification

Qualifying

Combined results

References

Grand Prix
New Zealand Grand Prix
January 1983 sports events in New Zealand